Richard Bancroft (1544 –  2 November 1610) was an English churchman, Archbishop of Canterbury from 1604 to 1610 and "chief overseer" of the King James Bible.

Life 

Bancroft was born in September 1544 at Farnworth, now part of Widnes, Cheshire, second son of John Bancroft, and his wife Mary. His mother was the daughter of James Curwen and niece to Hugh Curwen, Archbishop of Dublin from 1555 to 1567, then Bishop of Oxford until his death in November 1568.

He was initially educated at the local grammar school, founded by bishop William Smyth, also from Farnworth, before moving to Cambridge. He first attended Christ's College, followed by Jesus College; he took his degree of BA in 1567, then MA in 1570.

He was older than most students, reportedly due to money problems, and apparently more successful at sports than study; in 1564, his uncle Hugh obtained a sinecure for him at St Patrick's, Dublin. Ordained about that time, he was named chaplain to Richard Cox, then bishop of Ely, and in 1575 was presented to the rectory of Teversham in Cambridgeshire. The next year he was one of the preachers to the university.

He graduated BD in 1580 and DD five years later. In 1584 he was made rector of St Andrew, Holborn. In 1585 he was appointed treasurer of St Paul's Cathedral, London, and in 1586 was made a member of the ecclesiastical commission. On 9 February 1589 he preached at Paul's Cross a sermon, the substance of which was a passionate attack on the Puritans. He described their speeches and proceedings, caricatured their motives, denounced the exercise of the right of private judgment, and set forth the divine right of bishops in such strong language that one of the queen’s councillors held it to amount to a threat against the supremacy of the crown.

In the following year Bancroft was made a prebendary of St Paul's; he had been canon of Westminster since 1587. He was chaplain successively to Lord Chancellor Hatton and Archbishop Whitgift. In June 1597, he was consecrated Bishop of London; and from this time, in consequence of the age and incapacity for business of Archbishop Whitgift, he was virtually invested with the power of primate, and had the sole management of ecclesiastical affairs. Among the more noteworthy cases which fell under his direction were the proceedings against "Martin Marprelate", Thomas Cartwright and his friends, and John Penry, whose "seditious writings" he caused to be intercepted and given up to the Lord Keeper.

In 1600 he was sent on an embassy, with others, to Emden, for the purpose of settling certain matters in dispute between the English and the Danes. This mission, however, failed. Bancroft was present at the death of Queen Elizabeth.

Archbishop of Canterbury 

In March 1604 Bancroft, on Whitgift's death, was appointed by royal writ president of convocation then assembled; and he there presented a book of canons collected by himself. It was adopted and received the royal approval, but was strongly opposed and set aside by Parliament two months afterwards. In the following November he was elected successor to Whitgift in the see of Canterbury. He continued to show the same zeal and severity as before, and with so much success that Lord Clarendon, writing in his praise, expressed the opinion that "if Bancroft had lived, he would quickly have extinguished all that fire in England which had been kindled at Geneva."

In 1608 he was chosen chancellor of the University of Oxford. One of his last public acts was a proposal laid before Parliament for improving the revenues of the Church, and a project for a college of controversial divinity at Chelsea. In the last few months of his life he took part in the discussion about the consecration of certain Scottish bishops, and it was in pursuance of his advice that they were consecrated by several bishops of the English Church. By this act were laid the foundations of the Scottish Episcopal Church. Bancroft was "the chief overseer" of the authorized version of the Bible. He died at Lambeth Palace on 2 November 1610.

Discovery of his coffin

In 2016, during the refurbishment of the Garden Museum, which is housed at the medieval church of St Mary-at-Lambeth, 30 lead coffins were found; one with an archbishop's red and gold mitre on top of it. On one of these coffins, a metal plate served to identify it as being that of Bancroft.

See also 

 John Bancroft, his nephew and Master of University College, Oxford
 Hugh Curwen, Archbishop of Dublin 1555 to 1567, Bishop of Oxford 1567 to 1568

References

Sources 
 
 
 *

External links
 Bancroft, Richard. (1693.) A Survey of the Pretended Holy Discipline (in English). London: Richard Hodgkinson. This work is critical of the Puritan's doctrinal textbook, the Disciplina.

1544 births
1610 deaths
Translators of the King James Version
17th-century English Anglican priests
People from Widnes
16th-century Church of England bishops
17th-century Anglican archbishops
Bishops of London
Archbishops of Canterbury
Alumni of Christ's College, Cambridge
Alumni of Jesus College, Cambridge
Chancellors of the University of Oxford
Doctors of Divinity
Burials at St Mary-at-Lambeth
People from Farnworth
16th-century Anglican theologians
17th-century Anglican theologians